Robert Watson Ferguson (born February 23, 1965) is an American lawyer and politician serving as the 18th attorney general of Washington. A member of the Democratic Party, he was first elected in 2012 and re-elected in 2016 and 2020. Prior to serving as Attorney General, Ferguson was a member of the King County Council.

In 2017, Ferguson was included on the annual Time 100 list of the most influential people in the world.

Early life and education
Ferguson was born in Seattle in 1965. He is a fourth-generation Washingtonian, whose great-grandparents homesteaded on the Skagit River in the 19th century, near what is now Marblemount. He graduated from Bishop Blanchet High School in 1983 and then attended the University of Washington, where he was elected Student Body President. After college, Ferguson joined Jesuit Volunteer Corps Northwest and directed an emergency services office for a year.

Ferguson earned a Juris Doctor from the New York University School of Law. During law school, he received a grant to provide legal assistance to the Yaqui tribe in Guadalupe, Arizona. Ferguson lived in Guadalupe for a time, assisting community members on a wide range of legal matters.

Career 
After graduating from law school, Ferguson began his legal career in Spokane, where he served as a law clerk for Chief Judge William Fremming Nielsen of the Federal District Court for Eastern Washington, who was appointed by George H. W. Bush. He then clerked for Judge Myron Bright of the 8th Circuit Court of Appeals in the Midwest, who was appointed by Lyndon Johnson.

After his clerkship, Ferguson returned to Seattle and joined Preston Gates & Ellis (now K&L Gates) as a litigator, a Washington Special Assistant Attorney General law firm, where he represented individuals, businesses, local governments, and Washington corporations. As an attorney, Ferguson worked with the legal team that successfully defended taxpayers from paying for cost overruns associated with Safeco Field construction. He was part of the legal team that successfully challenged the constitutionality of Tim Eyman's initiatives.

Ferguson worked on cases involving software piracy and successfully sued companies that stole intellectual property from Washington companies. Ferguson also donated hundreds of hours of free legal advice to non-profit organizations. For example, he assisted Kruckeberg Botanic Garden Foundation as legal counsel to turn a six-acre garden into a public park in Shoreline.

After four years at Preston Gates & Ellis, Ferguson decided to run for the King County Council.

King County Council

Elections
Ferguson was first elected to the King County Council in 2003 by defeating Cynthia Sullivan, a 20-year veteran of the Council. Ferguson managed to outpoll Sullivan by about 500 votes. At the time, the council was elected on a partisan basis. Ferguson faced no general election opponent in the heavily Democratic district. During his campaign to unseat Sullivan, Ferguson knocked on 22,000 doors in the district.
 
As a result of the council reduction, redistricting placed Ferguson in the same district as another Democratic County Councilmember, Carolyn Edmonds of Shoreline. Ferguson narrowly defeated Edmonds. He went on to defeat Republican challenger Steven Pyeatt in the general election, winning approximately 74% of the vote.

Tenure
Before being elected attorney general, Ferguson served on the King County Council, where he represented Council District 1, which includes northeast Seattle, Shoreline, Lake Forest Park, Kenmore, Bothell, Kirkland, and part of Woodinville.

During his time on the Council, Ferguson served as Chair of the Regional Policy and Law, Justice and Human Services Committees and twice chaired of the Council's Law and Justice Committee. In 2005, he co-sponsored legislation to place a ballot measure before the voters of King County to generate revenue to improve health services for veterans and military personnel. County residents approved the measure. In 2011, King County voters renewed the Veterans and Human Services Levy.

When King County Executive's office proposed spending $6.8 million for new furniture for the new County office building, Ferguson pushed the County to buy used furniture instead, saving taxpayers more than $1 million.

Ferguson led the effort to raise $50 million annually to assist those suffering from mental illness and chemical dependency. He received the Booth Gardner Mental Health Champion award from Sound Mental Health in 2011. Ferguson successfully fought for $5 million to fund public health clinics in Northgate and Bothell that were threatened with closure.

Ferguson served on the Youth Justice Coordinating Council on Gangs. He pushed for civilian oversight of the King County Sheriff's office. In 2006, he helped lead the effort to create permanent oversight in the King County Sheriff's office.

He sponsored the Open Space Preservation Act, which protects 100,000 acres of open space. Ferguson authored legislation that prevents King County from doing business with companies known to repeatedly violate wage theft laws.

In 2007, Ferguson co-sponsored legislation increasing the sales tax by one tenth of one percent in order to expand mental health, chemical dependency and therapeutic court programs to reduce costly and unnecessary involvement in the criminal justice system by mentally ill and chemically dependent individuals, and to save lives. The council approved the measure on a bipartisan vote. In 2009, Ferguson co-sponsored bi-partisan legislation that called on the Executive to streamline the County's procurement process. Along with Republican Kathy Lambert, Bob co-sponsored legislation that eliminated 15 pages of paper forms required to contract with King County (Ordinance 2010-0186).

Ferguson also worked to reform County government by connecting workers' wages to the economy, leading the Seattle Times to write, "This is brand new, necessary stuff in a county that can ill afford the existing approach. These changes would not be possible without the hard work of Republican Kathy Lambert and Council Chairman Bob Ferguson…Ferguson is taking considerable heat from labor for sticking his neck out on policies that may be anathema to his constituents. Ferguson's work should inspire other Democrats on the council to join him in moving the county forward to the 21st century."

He co-sponsored legislation promoting the use of small businesses in fulfilling county contracts. (Ordinance 2007-0146). Ferguson co-sponsored legislation in 2011 creating a "Small Business Accelerator" program. He declined to take a pay raise during tough economic times. Ferguson also helped lead the effort for an independent audit of the county's election office.

In 2010, Ferguson sponsored a ballot measure that would increase the sales tax to provide additional revenues to King County. Proposition No. 1 Sales and Use Tax. The measure failed 54.9% to 45.1%. He wrote the law that reformed the county's public records process to ensure that citizens can easily obtain records and monitor their government.

Ferguson was presented with the Landmark Deeds Award for Public Service by the Washington Trust for Historic Preservation.

The Center for Human Services selected Ferguson as the 2008 recipient of their annual Dorrit Pealy Award for Outstanding Community Service. Food Lifeline gave Ferguson a Special Appreciation Award at its annual Ending Hunger Awards luncheon. In 2010, Ferguson was selected to join the Aspen Institute-Rodel Fellowship, a program that brings together the nation's most promising political leaders.

Attorney General of Washington

Elections
In 2012, Bob Ferguson defeated fellow King County Councilmember Reagan Dunn to be elected as the 18th Attorney General of Washington State. Ferguson won by a margin of more than 200,000 votes, receiving 53.48% of the vote to Dunn's 46.52%.

Ferguson won despite an unprecedented amount being spent by an out-of-state group in Washington state Attorney General's race. During the course of the campaign, Ferguson visited all 39 Washington state counties.

In 2016, Ferguson faced only Joshua Trumbull, a Libertarian with no political experience. 
Ferguson spent little of the money he had raised for the campaign, and he was re-elected, 67% to 33%. He garnered the most votes of any state candidate and carried 37 of the state's 39 counties.

In 2020, Ferguson faced Matt Larkin, a political newcomer and strong Trump supporter, who said that Ferguson was too soft on crime and criticized his legal challenges of the Trump administration. Ferguson handily won reelection, 56% to 43%.

Tenure
Ferguson sued the Trump administration 97 times, leading 36 of the cases, realizing victory 22 times, and losing once.

Arlene's Flowers lawsuit

In April 2013 Ferguson filed a consumer protection lawsuit against Barronelle Stutzman and her Richland, Washington floral shop Arlene's Flowers even without a complaint by Robert Ingersoll and his fiance Curt Freed.

Ferguson claimed the business violated Washington's consumer protection law after Stutzman refused to provide flowers for the couple's same sex wedding. The attorney general's office sent a letter to Stutzman informing her she was in violation of Washington State's Consumer Protection Act. A letter by Ferguson called for a penalty of $2,000 and to celebrate all same sex unions. Stutzman sent back a reply that it was against her religious beliefs to do so. The attorney general's office followed up with a phone call to Stutzman, giving her an opportunity to comply with the law, head off legal action, and avoid paying fees or costs. Stutzman responded with a letter from her lawyer. The move was criticized by Stutzman's lawyer, who stated Ferguson did not have the statutory authority to file the lawsuit and that it was uncertain whether or not it was a "clear case of discrimination". The engaged couple's attorneys at the American Civil Liberties Union then sued the florist for damages.

The couple had been previous clients of Stutzman for nine years until they had requested her services for their wedding, which she refused to do based upon her religious view on same sex marriage. Stutzman filed a counter-suit, stating that Ferguson's lawsuit was an attempt to force her to violate her religious beliefs. Stutzman and her attorneys at the Alliance Defending Freedom requested that the lawsuit be dismissed, as they alleged that the suit didn't show that the couple had suffered any financial injury to their business or property. Judge Sal Mendoza Jr. ruled that the lawsuit could continue, as the time and travel spent traveling to Arlene's Flowers and finding another florist did count as financial injury.

On February 18, 2015, Benton County Superior Court Judge Alexander Ekstrom ruled she had violated the state's anti-discrimination law. On February 19, 2015, Stutzman stated she would appeal the ruling. On March 27, 2015, Judge Ekstrom ordered Stutzman to pay a $1,000 fine, plus $1 for court costs and fees.

On November 15, 2016, Ferguson personally argued at the Washington Supreme Court hearing, which was held before an audience in Bellevue College's auditorium. On February 16, 2017, the Washington Supreme Court ruled unanimously against the florist. In the court's opinion, Justice Sheryl Gordon McCloud wrote neither the U.S. Constitution's Free Exercise Clause nor its Free Speech Clause gave the florist any right to refuse to participate in the wedding. On June 25, 2018 the Supreme Court of the United States vacated this decision and sent it back for rehearing in light of the Masterpiece Cakeshop v. Colorado Civil Rights Commission decision. On June 6, 2019, the Washington Supreme Court unanimously ruled against Stutzman again, finding no evidence of religious animus.

Comcast lawsuit
On August 1, 2016, Ferguson announced that the State of Washington would sue telecommunications company Comcast over deceptive consumer practices. The $100 million consumer protection lawsuit was filed over 1.8 million individual violations of the state's Consumer Protection Act.

Executive Order 13769

President Donald Trump signed Executive Order 13769 on January 27, 2017, which effectively banned entry to the United States for ninety days for non-citizens and refugees from seven Middle Eastern countries. On January 30, Ferguson and Governor Jay Inslee announced that the State would file a legal challenge against President Trump, as well as relevant administrative secretaries, to overturn the order, arguing that it was a case of religious discrimination.

Ferguson filed suit within 72 hours, with statements of support from Washington-based companies, including Amazon and Microsoft. In the United States District Court for the Western District of Washington on February 3, 2017, U.S. District Judge James L. Robart ruled in Ferguson's favor for a temporary restraining order on the enforcement of the travel ban nationwide.

Personal life

Bob Ferguson is an enthusiastic mountain climber, backpacker, and birder, and has hiked hundreds of miles of Washington trails and climbed many of the state's highest peaks. After college, Ferguson traveled around the country to see a baseball game in every major league stadium.

Ferguson is an internationally rated chess master. His games have appeared in local, national and international chess publications, and he has twice won the Washington State Chess Championship. In 2014, he had a 2146 rating, and currently holds a 2232 FIDE rating. He and his wife Colleen live in Seattle with their twins.

Electoral history

References

External links

Office of the Attorney General government website
Campaign website

1965 births
21st-century American politicians
American chess players
King County Councillors
Living people
New York University School of Law alumni
University of Washington alumni
Washington (state) Attorneys General
Washington (state) Democrats
Bishop Blanchet High School alumni